Nkiru Sylvanus  (born 21 April 1985) is a Nigerian actress and politician. She has featured in over two hundred movies and won the awards for Best Actress of the Year at the Africa Magic Viewers Choice Awards and Best Actress in a Leading Role at the Africa Movie Academy Awards.

Early life and education
Sylvanus was born in Osisioma, Aba, a city located in Abia State, Nigeria. She attended Ohabiam Primary and Secondary School, where she obtained her first school leaving certificate and West African Senior School Certificate. She also attended the Enugu State University of Science and Technology, graduating with a BSc degree in mass communication.

Acting career
Described by The Punch newspaper as a veteran, Sylvanus began her acting career at the age of 19, in 2001. She has been featured in over 70 Nollywood movies.

She has been featured twice (2017 & 2018) in The Guardian's publication on Celebrities Who Made Headlines.

Political career
In 2011, Sylvanus was included in the cabinet of former governor of Imo state Rochas Okorocha  as his Special Assistant on Lagos State Affairs and later became his Special Adviser on Public Affairs.

2012 kidnap and release
Sylvanus, who was a special assistant to former Governor of Imo state, Rochas Okorocha on Public affairs was kidnapped on 15 December 2012 at 2.30pm as reported by various reputable Nigerian media houses. A Vanguard media publication reported that a ransom of a ₦100,000,000 (One hundred million naira) which was (per exchange rate) in 2012 equivalent to $640,000 (Six Hundred and forty thousand U.S dollars) was demanded by her captors in exchange for her release. It was reported by Nigerian media houses that on 21 December 2012 at 10:30pm, Sylvanus was released from her kidnappers.

Awards
Best Actress of the Year at the Africa Magic Viewers Choice Awards
Best Actress in a Leading Role at the Africa Movie Academy Awards

Personal life
For The first time in her life, 
On January 12, 2023 she married the love of her life Riches Sammy  traditionally in her hometown in Osisioma local Government Area Abia state. Her husband is a Japan base actor, TV personality, Film maker, Entrepreneur and an Investor who invested in Japanese Nightlife entertainment and Hospitality Industry and owns few businesses in Japan and Nigeria.
 They had their white/church wedding in Enugu state on January 15, 2023.

Selected filmography

MY HEART
Final Tussle (2008) 
Life Bullets (2007)
Fine Things (2007)
No More Love (2007)
Secret Pain (2007)
She Is My Sister (2007)
The Last Supper (2007)
Treasures Of Fortune (2007)
Alice My First Lady (2006)
Buried Emotion (2006)
Divided Attention (2006)
Pastor’s Blood (2006)
Serious Issue (2006)
Sweetest Goodbye (2006) 
What A Mother (2005)
Dangerous Mind (2004)
Hope Of Glory (2004)
King Of The Jungle (2004)
My Blood (2004)
Queen (2004)
The Staff Of Odo (2004)
Unconditional Love (2003)
Egg Of Life (2003)
Green Snake (2003) 
Six Problems (2003)
Holy Violence (2003) 
Last Weekend (2003)
Onunaeyi: Seeds Of Bondage (2003)
The Only Hope (2003)
A Cry For Help (2002)
Love In Bondage (2002)
Miracle (2002)
Pretender (2002)
Unknown Mission (2002)
Never Come Back (2002) 
Terrible Sin (2001)

References

External links
 

Living people
21st-century Nigerian actresses
Igbo actresses
Enugu State University of Science and Technology alumni
Igbo politicians
Nigerian actor-politicians
Actresses from Imo State
Nigerian women in politics
Nigerian politicians
1985 births